Sidsel Mørck (born 28 November 1937) is a Norwegian poet, novelist and columnist.

Mørck made her literary debut in 1967 with the poetry collection Et ødselt sekund. Since then, she has published over 30 novels, short stories and collections of poems for adults and children. As an activist, she has written over 120 articles on social issues, particularly environmental protection and industrial pollution, and given a number of lectures.

In 2013, Mørck received the Ossietzky Award, in recognition of her strong social commitment, especially in the field of women's affairs, gender roles and environmental protection. As well as including these issues in her writing, Mørck is an active social debater and columnist.

Mørck was on the board of The Sophie Prize, an international environment and development prize awarded annually from 1998 to 2013.

Early life 
Mørck grew up in Sandefjord, Norway. For ten years, from 1968 to 1978, she lived in the industrial area of Norsk Hydro in Porsgrunn, which sparked her commitment to environmental protection.

Her stepgrandfather, Dimitri Dimitrivich Koloboff, who she called dad, came to Norway from Russia in 1920. His journey is the subject of Mørck's 2010 book Pappa – a Russian refugee.

Awards 

 1976: Mads Wiel Nygaards Endowment
 1988 : Oppretter Venstres miljøpris
 1989 : Kardemommestipendiet
 1990 : Fritt Ord Honorary Award
 1991 : Rachel Carson Prize (environmentalist award)
 1993 : Government scholar
 2009 : Vestfold Literature Prize (Vestfolds Litteraturpris)
 2012 : Ordknappen 2012 for the book Brother
 2013 : Ossietzky Award

References

1937 births
Living people
Writers from Oslo
20th-century Norwegian novelists
21st-century Norwegian novelists
20th-century Norwegian poets
Norwegian women novelists
Norwegian women poets
21st-century Norwegian women writers
20th-century Norwegian women writers